Patersonia is a rural locality in the local government area of Launceston, in the Northern region of Tasmania. The 2016 census determined a population of 85 for the state suburb of Patersonia.

History
Patersonia was named for Colonel William Paterson, Lieutenant Governor of the colony of New South Wales. The locality was gazetted in 1963.

Geography
The St Patricks River forms the south-eastern boundary.

Road infrastructure
The C854 route (Patersonia Road) enters from the south and exits to the north-east, where it then runs north along the eastern boundary. The C828 route (Targa Hill Road) starts at an intersection with C854 on the eastern boundary and runs away to the south-east. The C829 route (Pecks Hill Road) starts at an intersection with C854 in the centre of the locality and exits to the east.

References

Launceston, Tasmania
Localities of City of Launceston
Towns in Tasmania